SuperCROSS is a desktop tabulation software tool used by statisticians for aggregating and cross-tabulating data from surveys. It does not require programming expertise, but offers a windows based environment and a drag-and-drop graphical interface.  It is a product of the SuperSTAR Suite licensed by Space Time Research, a software development firm located in Melbourne Australia who have worked with the Australian Bureau of Statistics since 1986.

Other statistical organisations using SuperCROSS as at August 2014 include: 
 The Cancer Council Victoria Visit Website 
 Tourism Research Australia Austrade 
 National Centre for Vocational Educational Research 
 Statistics New Zealand 
 Fachstelle fur Statistik Kanton St. Gallen 
 Kuwait Authority for Civil Information 
 King Faisal Specialist Hospital & Research Center  
 Northern Ireland Statistics and Research Agency 
 National Records of Scotland 
 Swiss Federal Office for Building & Logistics 
 Bureau of Economic Analysis Foundation 
 Bundesanstalt Statistik Osterreich  
 Amt fur Statistik Berlin-Brandenburg 
 Statistics Finland 
 Statistics South Africa 
 Statistics Sweden 
 US Census

Software Features 

 Ad hoc Analysis
 Cross tabulation 
 Hierarchical Classification Support 
 Survey support – using replicate and standard weights
 Metadata
 Output formats include Excel, HTML, XML and CSV

References 

http://www.statssa.gov.za/census01/html/CommProfilesTraining.pdf
http://devplan.kzntl.gov.za/General/Presentations/2004Jun1/SuperCROSS_Introduction.pdf

External links 

 SuperCross home page at SpaceTime Research

Data analysis software